Abraham Gotthelf Kästner (27 September 1719 – 20 June 1800) was a German mathematician and epigrammatist.

He was known in his professional life for writing textbooks and compiling encyclopedias rather than for original research. Georg Christoph Lichtenberg was one of his doctoral students, and admired the man greatly. He became most well known for his epigrammatic poems. The crater Kästner on the Moon is named after him.

Life 

Kästner was the son of law professor Abraham Kästner. He married Anna Rosina Baumann in 1757 after a 12-year engagement. She died on 4 March 1758, less than a year later, of a lung disease. Later Kästner had a daughter Catharine with his cleaning lady.

Kästner studied law, philosophy, physics, mathematics and metaphysics in Leipzig from 1731, and was appointed a Notary in 1733. He gained his habilitation from the University of Leipzig in 1739, and lectured there in mathematics, philosophy, logic and law, becoming an associate professor in 1746. In 1751 he was elected a member of the Royal Swedish Academy of Sciences. In 1756 he took up a position as full professor of natural philosophy and geometry at the University of Göttingen. In 1763, succeeding Tobias Mayer, he became director of the observatory as well. One of his doctoral students was the physicist and aphorist Georg Christoph Lichtenberg, who became a colleague of his at Göttingen. Other notable doctoral students were Johann Christian Polycarp Erxleben, Johann Pfaff (doctoral advisor of Carl Friedrich Gauss), Johann Tobias Mayer, Heinrich Wilhelm Brandes, Farkas Bolyai (father of János Bolyai), and Georg Klügel. Kästner died in 1800 in Göttingen.

Work 

Kästner became most well known for his poems, which appeared first in print without his consent in 1781 and were notable for their biting humour and sharp irony on different contemporary personalities. They were published in Vermischten Schriften 1 und 2 (Altenburg 1783, 2 volumes), and further poems were published in Gesammelten poetischen und prosaischen schönwissenschaftlichen Werken (Berlin 1841, 4 volumes) and later in Joseph Kürschner's Deutscher Nationalliteratur, volume 73 (hrsg. von Minor; Stuttgart 1883).

His numerous mathematical writings include Anfangsgründe der Mathematik ("Foundations of Mathematics") (Göttingen 1758-69, 4 volumes; 6th edition 1800) and Geschichte der Mathematik ("History of Mathematics") (Göttingen 1796-1800, 4 volumes). Geschichte der Mathematik is considered an astute work, but lacks a comprehensive overview of all subsections of mathematics.

He also translated many volumes of the Proceedings of Royal Swedish Academy of Sciences into German, including all volumes of the Proceedings (Handlingar) between 1749 and 1781 and some volumes of New Proceedings (Nya handlingar) from 1784 to 1792.

He was elected a Fellow of the Royal Society in April 1789.

Publications

References

External links
 
 
 
 Theoria radicum in aequationibus – Europeana

1719 births
1800 deaths
18th-century German mathematicians
German Lutherans
German encyclopedists
German historians of mathematics
Writers from Leipzig
People from the Electorate of Saxony
Leipzig University alumni
Academic staff of Leipzig University
Academic staff of the University of Göttingen
Members of the Royal Swedish Academy of Sciences
Fellows of the Royal Society
German male non-fiction writers
18th-century German male writers